The 2004 Basildon District Council election took place on 10 June 2004 to elect members of Basildon District Council in Essex, England. One third of the council was up for election and the Conservative party stayed in overall control of the council.

After the election, the composition of the council was
Conservative 25
Labour 14
Liberal Democrats 3

Election result

All comparisons in vote share are to the corresponding 2000 election.

Ward results

Billericay East

Billericay West

Burstead

Crouch

Fryerns

Laindon Park

Langdon Hills

Lee Chapel North

Nethermayne

Pitsea North West

Pitsea South East

St Martin's

Vange

Wickford North

References

2004
2004 English local elections
2000s in Essex